Rore is a lake in the municipalities of Grimstad and Arendal in Agder county, Norway. This lake, which is used as a reservoir, lies mostly in Grimstad. There is a public beach area at the southern end of the lake, near the village of Roresand.

The lake Syndle flows into Rore from the east and Rore is flows out into the river Nidelva at the northern end.

See also
List of lakes in Aust-Agder
List of lakes in Norway

References

Arendal
Grimstad
Lakes of Agder